Alex Kidd is a video game character whose popularity peaked during the late 1980s. Alex Kidd was recognized as Sega’s unofficial mascot and the protagonist of both a series of video games released by Sega and their fictional universe, as well as in numerous spin-offs such as novelisations and comics.

Alex Kidd is in several video games, spanning various platforms, and appeared in the arcade and on the Master System and Mega Drive/Genesis home consoles. Alex Kidd's popularity was at a peak with the release of the first game in the series, Alex Kidd in Miracle World in 1986. Although Sega wished to have a mascot to rival Nintendo's flagship character Mario, which Alex Kidd was not considered up to the task, that was rested upon a spaceship called Opa-Opa, until Sonic the Hedgehog took over in 1991 as Sega’s official mascot which made Alex Kidd become the unofficial mascot of Sega until 1990s. After Sonic’s rise, Alex Kidd fell into obscurity as the development of new games in the series stopped. Despite that, he has made cameo appearances in other games. A remake of the first game was released on June 22, 2021, making it the first main appearance of the character since the 1990's Alex Kidd in Shinobi World.

Character description

Alex Kidd appears as a short boy with large ears and slightly monkey-like features, a red and yellow jumpsuit, and oversized hands. Sometimes he appeared as a teenager, with his age stated to be 14 years old in human terms. He is a member of an alien race known as the Arians, a species possessing an incredibly long lifespan, with Alex himself having lived many hundreds of years previously.

The initial appearance of the character would swing between garb loosely resembling a traditional Mandarin tunic or red-striped jumpsuit, sometimes overalls closer to the appearance of Mario depending on the localisation

First Appearance 
Alex Kidd in Miracle World which was released on the Sega Master System, on November 1, 1986. It is a single-player 8-bit side-scroller that was designed by Kotaro Hayashida who is also known as Ossak Kohta. Kohta also worked on other Sega projects, such as Phantasy Star, Zillion, and Shining Force. The game is set in Miracle World and Alex Kidd begins studying on Mt. Eternal, on the planet Aries (also known as "Miracle World"), where he has trained in the Shellcore technique. This technique enables an Arian to alter the size and toughness of their fists through sheer willpower, and enables one to shatter rocks with bare fists.

After the disappearance of King Thunder (referred to in-game as "King Sander"), the planet Aries is thrown into disarray. A usurper, Janken the Great, kidnaps the next in line to the throne, Prince Igul (referred to in the manual as "Egle"), and his fiancée Princess Lora. Many of the citizens are turned to stone through Janken's magic. Alex Kidd learns from a dying man that he is in fact a lost member of the Radaxian Royal Family, son of King Thunder and brother of Prince Egle. Alex Kidd sets out to discover the whereabouts of his father, rescue his brother, restore the kingdom, and destroy the monstrous minions of Janken. Numerous magical artefacts and medallions must be discovered to progress in the story.

During the game, Alex can collect "Baums" (the currency of Miracle World) which can then be used to purchase extra lives, items, power-ups and vehicles for Alex Kidd from shops at the start of several stages, such as the Sukopako Motorcycle and the Petit-copter, a small pedal-powered helicopter.

After Alex defeats Janken the Great, the game explains how Alex restores peace to Radaxian, and that the people who were turned to stone by Janken have returned to normal. In the city, Egle is crowned King of Radaxian, and Alex Kidd, with his martial arts, takes the position of Defender of the City, although his next goal will be to find his father, King Thunder.

Alex in a Miracle World, became a cult classic and was remade in 2021 called Alex Kidd in Miracle World DX which was released on all modern day home consoles.

Series

Alex Kidd: The Lost Stars (1986) 
Alex Kidd: The Last Stars was a sequel that was released in 1986, the same year as Miracle World debuted. This game was the only Alex Kidd game to ever have an arcade release. Although Lost Stars has a few changes compared to its predecessor. Lost Stars was a two-player arcade game and it seems to reflect similarities to Super Mario Bros. The Lost Stars has Alex Kidd on a mission to find the 12 Miracle Balls, which were stolen from the Aries constellation by Evil Ziggarat.

This game has 12 levels and once finishing a level Alex receives one of the 12 Miracles Balls. Another change that this sequel made is that Alex loses his ability and the rock, paper, and scissors were also taken out of the game and Alex has projectiles that allow him to attack. The Aracde never made it out of Japan though until 1988 when it was changed to the Master System for Western sales, but it was not as successful as its predecessor.

Alex Kidd BMX Trail (1987) 
Alex Kidd BMX Trail was only released in Japan on December 31, 1987. The design of the game is closely related to Miracle World. Alex Kidd is set to race in a selection of course and compete against colourful rival racers.

Alex Kidd in High-Tech World (1989) 
Alex Kidd in High-Tech World was announced and shipped in 1989 for the western fans of the character. There was a change to Alex’s appearance and to the gameplay. High-Tech world is more of a treasure-seeking, adventure than the usual action, and adventure. The same year of the release of High-Tech World was launched Sega released 16-bit Genesis in America, but even with the new released console Alex Kidd in the Enchanted Castle was released.

Alex Kidd in the Enchanted Castle (1989) 
Alex Kidd in the Enchanted Castle was released in Japan on the 10th February 1989 and the fifth game in the series and the only one that was released on the Genesis 16-bit console. Within the game Alex hears a rumour that his long lost father (referred to in this game as King Thor) is alive and well on the Planet Paperock (known in Japan as "Janbarik"). The planet earned this name as it is inhabited by experts at the game "Paper, Rock, Scissors". Despite discouragement from his family, Alex travels to Planet Paperock in hopes of finding his father and learns that the king had been kidnapped by Ashra, son of Janken the Great. After travelling to the Sky Castle, King Thunder reveals that he was not abducted by Ashra, and was using him as a servant. Alex Kidd in the Enchanted Castle returns to the similar gameplay to Miracle World and it reintroduces the rock, paper, scissors to defeat the level bosses.

Alex Kidd in Shinobi World (1990) 
Alex Kidd in Shinobi World is the last game in the Alex Kidd series, although this game is different to rest of the series in the way of the controls and that it is a parody of Shinobi (1987, Sega), a ninja game that was released as an arcade game but then later rereleased to the Master System, and the Amiga computer.

Alex Kidd in Miracle World DX (2021) 
Alex Kidd in Miracle World DX is the remake of the Alex Kidd in Miracle World. Which was released on the 22nd of June, 2021, it was released on multiple modern home consoles. The developers of Merge Games, and Jankenteam updated the look of the game from the original 1986 game, managing to keep a faithful adaptation and adding new levels, different modes, and new and remastered music.

Cameos
Alex Kidd has continued to make cameo appearances in other Sega titles, including as a playable character in Sega Superstars Tennis, Sonic & Sega All-Stars Racing, and Sonic & All-Stars Racing Transformed.

Alex Kidd appears in a Dreamcast game named Segagaga, a RPG where you are to help SEGA win the video game war. Through the story, you meet Alex Kidd working at a video game store, harbouring a sad backstory.

Alex and his girlfriend (who is from the arcade game Alex Kidd and The Lost Stars) appear on gravestones in the first round in Altered Beast.

He also appears as collectible toys in Shenmue and Shenmue II.

Alex Kidd's face can be found near the dead end and next to the Lava pit in Kenseiden.

Alex Kidd is one of several Sega and Capcom guest heroes who are recruited by Sonic the Hedgehog and Break Man to battle Sigma in the Worlds Unite crossover from Archie Comics. The crossover spans Archie's Sonic the Hedgehog, Sonic Universe, Sonic Boom, and Mega Man comic series.

References

 
 
 
 
 
 
 

 
Video game characters introduced in 1986
Child characters in video games
Extraterrestrial characters in video games
Male characters in video games
Sega protagonists
Prince characters in video games
Video game mascots